The W.W. Griest Building, also known as the Lancaster Federal Building and PP&L Building, is a historic skyscraper located in the city of Lancaster, Pennsylvania. It was designed by noted Lancaster architect C. Emlen Urban and built 1924–1925. It is built in the Italian Renaissance Revival style and is a steel frame building faced in granite, limestone, and terra cotta. The Griest Building is fourteen stories tall and each floor measures 66 feet by 55 feet, or 3,600 square feet. The 12th floor, now office space, once housed a 300-seat auditorium with a green and gold frescoed ceiling. A 53 foot tall tower was added to the top of the building in 1976. The W.W. Griest Building is the second tallest building in the city of Lancaster.

The W.W. Griest Building is named after William Walton Griest, a former Pennsylvania representative and head of Lancaster Public Utilities.

It has been listed on the U.S. National Register of Historic Places since June 25, 1999.

References

External links
 City of Lancaster, PA

Commercial buildings on the National Register of Historic Places in Pennsylvania
Buildings and structures in Lancaster, Pennsylvania
History of Lancaster, Pennsylvania
Renaissance Revival architecture in Pennsylvania
Commercial buildings completed in 1925
National Register of Historic Places in Lancaster, Pennsylvania
Skyscrapers in Pennsylvania
Skyscraper office buildings in Pennsylvania